Toni Bruce is a New Zealand sociology academic, specialising in the sociology of sport. She is currently a full professor at the University of Auckland. She gained her Masters and PhD degrees at the University of Illinois in the USA. She previously worked at the University of New Hampshire (USA) University of Canberra (Australia) and University of Waikato (New Zealand). While teaching at the University of Auckland Bruce participated in many fields of research. Her main topics involve sports media, gender issues, nationalism, race/ethnicity and disability. Bruce is an expert in many different topics including journalism, media analysis and theory, and the impacts of sociological aspects of identity on people's experiences. She supervises students throughout the Masters and the Doctorate programs that include her main topics of research.

Academic career

After a 1995 PhD titled What we talk about when we talk about the locker room: Women sportswriters' stories at the University of Illinois, Urbana-Champaign, she moved to the University of Auckland, rising to full professor.

Bruce's research has been discussed in the New Zealand media and they are frequently used as an expert commentator on sports issues and have written opinion pieces.

Current 
Toni is currently researching ethnographic fieldwork on netball fandom in New Zealand. This type of studies require her to observe and have conversations with the fans that are attending the netball games. This also requires her to observe the TV ratings and newspaper coverage within the netball sport. She is also doing a recent study of what the Rugby World Cups means to New Zealanders. She is doing so by observing studies from games recent games and past games during the 2015, 2011 and 2007 Cups. She is researching in particular the relationship between all blacks and other nationalities.  

Selected works
 Wensing, Emma H., and Toni Bruce. "Bending the rules: Media representations of gender during an international sporting event." International review for the sociology of sport 38, no. 4 (2003): 387–396.
 Bruce, Toni. "Marking the boundaries of the ‘normal’in televised sports: The play-by-play of race." Media, Culture & Society 26, no. 6 (2004): 861–879.
 Bruce, Toni, and Christopher Hallinan. "The quest for Australian identity." Sport stars: The cultural politics of sporting celebrity 2, no. 3 (2001): 257–273.
 Bruce, Toni. "Reflections on communication and sport: On women and femininities." Communication & Sport 1, no. 1-2 (2013): 125–137.
 Bruce, Toni. "Audience frustration and pleasure: Women viewers confront televised women's basketball." Journal of Sport and Social Issues 22, no. 4 (1998): 373–397.

References

External links
  

Living people
New Zealand women academics
University of Illinois Urbana-Champaign alumni
New Zealand sociologists
Academic staff of the University of Auckland
Year of birth missing (living people)
New Zealand women writers